George Jenkins may refer to:

 George Jenkins (Australian politician) (1878–1957)
 George Jenkins (soccer) (1904–1985), Canadian soccer player
 George W. Jenkins (1907–1996), founder of Publix
 George C. Jenkins (1908–2007), American production designer
 George J. Jenkins (died 2002), politician in the Legislative Assembly of New Brunswick
 George Jenkins (musician) (1911–1967), American jazz drummer who worked with artists such as Jimmy Bryant and who led the band George Jenkins and the Tune Twisters
 George Neil Jenkins (1914–2007), professor of oral physiology
 George P. Jenkins (1914–2009), American business executive
 George Jenkins (born 1973), American dentist and motivational speaker of The Three Doctors

See also
 George W. Jenkins High School, a high school in Lakeland, Florida